Muhlenberg High School is a midsized, public high school in Laureldale, Berks County, Pennsylvania. In the 2018–2019 school year, Muhlenberg High School's enrollment was 911 pupils (10–12th).

Extracurriculars
Muhlenberg School District offers a variety of clubs, activities and an extensive sports program.

Muhlenberg School District has an extensive athletics staff including:  Athletic Director, Head Athletic Trainer, Assistant Athletic Trainer, Aquatics Director, Director of Youth and Age Group Programs and an Equipment Manager.

Sports
The district funds:

Boys
Baseball - AAAA
Basketball- AAAA
Bowling - AAAA
Cross Country - AAA
Football - AAA
Golf - AAAA
Soccer - AAA
Swimming and Diving - AAA
Tennis - AAA
Track and Field - AAA
Water Polo - AAAA
Wrestling - AAA

Girls
Basketball - AAAA
Bowling - AAAA
Cheerleading
Cross Country - AAA
Field Hockey - AAA
Golf - AAA
Soccer (Fall) - AAA
Softball - AAA
Swimming and Diving - AAA
Girls' Tennis -AAA
Track and Field - AAA
Volleyball - AAA
Water Polo - AAAA

According to PIAA directory July 2013

Notable alumni
Doug Clemens, former Major League Baseball player

References

Schools in Berks County, Pennsylvania
Public high schools in Pennsylvania